Leanne Hall may refer to:

Leanne Hall (author), Australian author
Leanne Hall (footballer) (born 1980), English football goalkeeper

See also
Lianne Hall